(or ; ; ; ; ; ; ; meaning "horseradish" in all these languages) is a spicy paste made of grated horseradish. It is a common condiment for meat and fish dishes in Eastern and Central European cuisines (Slovene, northern Croatian, Belarusian, Czech, Slovak, German (especially Bavarian), Polish, Romanian, Latvian, Lithuanian, Russian, Ukrainian and Ashkenazi Jewish cuisine).  comes from Yiddish , which is in turn a loanword from Slavic languages.

White  consists of grated horseradish and vinegar, and sometimes sugar and salt, while red  includes the addition of beetroot. There are also varieties including apples, lingonberry, cranberry and oranges.

Though it has had several historical uses,  is most commonly associated in modern times with gefilte fish, for which it is considered an essential condiment. In Eastern and Central European cuisines chrain is a typical condiment for various fish dishes, as well as for meat and fish zakuski, such as kholodets (aspic) and beef tongue.

See also
 Khrenovina sauce
 Hrenovuha

References

Ashkenazi Jewish cuisine
Condiments
Slavic cuisine
Austrian cuisine
Belarusian cuisine
Croatian cuisine
Czech cuisine
German cuisine
Israeli cuisine
Polish cuisine
Latvian cuisine
Lithuanian cuisine
Romanian cuisine
Russian cuisine
Slovenian cuisine
Ukrainian cuisine
Horseradish (condiment)
Vinegar